The Nampa figurine (also known as the Nampa Image or the Nampa Doll) is a  fired clay doll found near Nampa, Idaho in 1889. The figurine has been dyed red, possibly due to iron oxide deposition, and depicts a female figure with jewelry and clothing. The artifact has been the subject of substantial controversy over its apparent age. The initial estimates of the artifact placed its age at 2 million years old, significantly outdating any other clay artifacts and humanity's arrival in the Americas.

While archeologists have debated whether the figurine was a hoax or not, the consensus is that the artifact is not 2 million years old. Archeologists George Frederick Wright, William Henry Holmes, and Keith Fitzpatrick-Matthews have argued that the object descended rapidly due to a geological phenomenon or was displaced by the drilling mechanism that originally uncovered the figurine. Wright, whilst being a strong proponent of the object's validity, estimated the age in terms of thousands of years. Wright's support of the Nampa figurine's genuineness has been heavily criticized as being religiously motivated. Daniel Garrison Brinton and John W. Powell argued the artifact was a 19th century doll made by the Pocatello Indians, with modern day archeologists holding the belief the artifact was a hoax.  Members of the Pocatello Native American tribe have also affirmed the figurine was a hoax. Due to the controversy surrounding the artifact's age, many conspiracy theories have arisen around the artifact's origin.

Description 
The Nampa figurine is a small female figure made out of fired clay. The figure was found to be well worn with faint markings that may have represented clothing or jewelry around the chest and neck. The right leg of the figure was broken off.

Later, a reproduction of the figurine was created by geologist Albert Allen Wright and chemist Frank Fanning Jewett, concluded that the piece could not have been made by a novice craftsman. The scientists noted that the red coloration of the doll was possibly due to iron oxide deposition, and not the doll's original color. Both Wright and Jewett were able to replicate the color through the use of acid staining. The figurine has often been compared to the Venus of Tan-Tan.

History 
The figurine was found in Nampa, Idaho in July 1889 by Mark A. Kurtz, a local businessman. Kurtz and his business partners were drilling for water, hitting a depth of  while lining the bore hole as they went. Once the drill had penetrated through the basalt layer, approximately 60 feet deep, the men transitioned to a pump mechanism to remove the quicksand and ceased drilling. Charles Francis Adams Jr. alongside a team of archeologists were contacted to perform the initial dating of the artifact.

Due to this find, in 1929, a formal archeological survey of the site was performed by Louis Schellbach with support from the Museum of the American Indian and the Heye Foundation. The figurine is now housed in the Idaho State Historical Society Museum.

Artifact dating 
Early dating efforts used the law of superposition to date the figurine. The figure was found at a clay and sand layer in the Glenns Ferry Formation dating to the Pliocene-Pleistocene transition. The sand layer was covered by a lava flow that was estimated to be deposited during the Late Tertiary or early Quaternary period, placing the figurine at an age of 2 million years old, during the early Pleistocene age. In 1904, a  U.S. Geological Survey atlas was published, affirming that the well had been dug "below the 60 feet of Quaternary material, 15 feet of basalt and 220 feet of sands with some clays". The atlas would affirm that the layers dug represented the Quaternary and Tertiary epochs.  Samuel Franklin Emmons, in his assessment of the rock layers, would conclude that there was no indication that the rock layer was from the Tertiary period.  Archeologist William Henry Holmes, an expert in out-of-place artifacts, stated:

George Frederick Wright, in 1911 and 1912, surveyed the site, ruling that the artifact's layer may be thousands of years old. Wright theorized that the rupture of Lake Bonneville and flooding Snake River Valley resulted in the region being buried in a sediment and quicksand. Soon after, volcanic eruptions formed the basalt layer, with Wright noting that the Nampa area was on the edge of the lava flow. Wright noted a similar phenomenon had occurred during the uplift of the Sierra Nevada Mountains during the beginning of the Glacial Epoch. Wright strongly contested that the artifact originated below the 60 ft deep basalt layer due to Kurtz lining the bore hole as he drilled, transitioning to a drill pump once the basalt layer had been breached. Wright's claim that the object was genuine and his flood theory have both been widely criticized by his contemporaries as pseudoarchaeology and an attempt to propagate Christian fundamentalism and creationism.

In 2011, archeologist and museum curator, Keith Fitzpatrick-Matthews would argue that the iron oxide responsible for staining the doll was found above the basalt layer (approximately  feet down) and that clay balls were found close to the bedrock layer. These clay balls showed similar iron oxide staining as the figurine. Fitzpatrick-Matthews posited that this was evidence of a rapid descent of artifacts in the soil, or that the drill had push these objects deeper prior to their unearthing. The figurine is considered similar to the designs of other Upper Palaeolithic European artifacts.

Controversy over validity 
It has been widely proposed that the figurine may have been a fake, or an attempt at a hoax. At the time of discovery, the oldest fire clay artifacts dated to 6,000 to 10,000 years old, and the oldest simple human depiction, the Venus of Tan-Tan, was only about 300,000 to 500,000 years old. Additionally, the first humans were estimated to have come to the Americas only 13,000 to 13,500 years ago. In between October and November 1889, Mark Kurtz and George Frederick Wright would engage in a series of letters detailing the limitations and mechanics of the drill pump. Wright concluded that had the object been intentionally dropped down the shaft, the pump actions would have destroyed the fragile artifact. Wright would become a major proponent behind the idea that the discovery was a genuine archeological find, albeit, not 2 million years old. 

Fredrick Ward Putnam and John Henry Haynes both claimed the artifact was not a hoax, with Haynes referring to it as "most important evidence of the great antiquity of man in America". The figure was presented to Fredrick Ward Putnam, who stated:

John W. Powell, a geologist sent to review the artifact, considered the figurine a hoax and would criticize the circumstances under which it was found. Powell would state the toy was nearly identical to those made by local Native American tribes, and claimed that the drill would have broken the artifact should it have been dug up. Additionally, Powell went on to harshly criticize Wright's affirmations that the object was genuine.  Members of the Pocatello Indians were later shown the artifact, who affirmed it was their craftsmanship and indeed a hoax. In 1892, Daniel Garrison Brinton, in the American Antiquarian and Oriental Journal, claimed the figurine was a hoax, also stating that the toy was similar to that of contemporary dolls made by the Pocatello Indians. William John McGee would claim that the Nampa figurine was a "transparent fraud" in a criticism of George Frederick Wright's endorsement of the artifact. 

Keith Fitzpatrick-Matthews argued the piece could not be 2 million years old as no other artifacts had been found around that time period. Carl Feagans, an expert in pseudoarchaeology, has claimed the figurine is a hoax. Feagans argued that during the time at which the figurine was found, archeological hoaxes were commonplace. Feagans compared the figurine to the Cardiff Giant, another archeological hoax at the time, and affirmed that the Nampa figurine was a 19th century Native American doll. Furthermore, Feagans would cite Frank Fanning Jewett's replication as evidence that the artifact was not stained by iron oxide deposition but rather contained iron oxide during its original firing. Archeologist Michael Brass would echo similar claims the figurine was a hoax and too fragile to survive the drilling process in his book The Antiquity of Man: Artifactual, Fossil and Gene Records Explored.

Conspiracy Theories 
Due to the controversial circumstances under which the artifact was found, the Nampa figurine has been used by creationists to support their claims. Other paranormal and occult theories have arisen that the artifact is evidence of a lost civilization or time travel.

In 2007, Michael Cremo wrote about the Nampa Figurine in the Forbidden Archaeology column of the Atlantis Rising magazine. Cremo, in his account, falsely claimed the artifact was found in a core sample and not brought up by a drill pump. Cremo would go on to claim there was a scientific conspiracy to hide artifact's age from the general public and used the figurine as proof of Old Earth creationism.

Charles Sellier and David W. Balsiger have claimed the artifact is evidence of the Genesis flood narrative in Christianity.

See also 

 Out-of-place artifact
 Pompey stone

References 

1889 in Idaho Territory
Nampa, Idaho
Archaeological forgeries
Hoaxes in the United States